Los Guatuzos Wildlife Refuge (Spanish: Refugio de Vida Silvestre Los Guatuzos) has an area of  and is located south of Lake Nicaragua and west of the San Juan River in Nicaragua. Los Guatuzos is a protected area consisting of tropical wetlands, rainforest, and wildlife refuge, it is the only internationally registered tropical wetland area in Nicaragua.

Overview
The site has been cataloged by UNESCO as a biosphere reserve and belongs to the list of cenagales (wetlands) of international importance of Ramsar Convention. The refuge comprises the Ecological Center of Los Guatuzos, a research center that offers guided visits, excursions and lodging in the park. It also has a butterfly farm, turtle and caiman nursery, and an orchid display of 92 different species.

Flora and fauna
Los Guatuzos is rich in flora and fauna. The number of recorded species of birds living in the wildlife refuge is recorded at over 389, which doesn't include the thousands of migratory birds that frequently visit the refuge. Some of the commonly spotted animals include caimans, crocodiles, jaguars, monkeys and feral pigs. Also present in the refuge are the ancient species of fish, although spotting them is rare. The Atractosteus tropicus, or gaspar, has fangs and a snout that help it consume other species of fish as well as turtles and crabs.

With regards to the fauna, 81 species of Amphibians, 136 species of reptile and 42 species of mammals are found in the park.

Botany
A total of twelve rivers pass through the reserve. A total of 315 species of plants exist including 130 Orchidaceae.

See also
 Wildlife of Nicaragua
 Tourism in Nicaragua
 Protected areas of Nicaragua
 World Network of Biosphere Reserves

References

External links

 Ecological Center of Los Guatuzos
 Los Guatuzos Ecological Center

Biosphere reserves of Nicaragua
Guatuzos, Los
Protected areas of Nicaragua
Río San Juan Department